FEIT (pronounced fight) is an Australian shoe and accessories brand based in New York City. Founded in 2005. Feit is owned and operated by brothers Tull and Josh Price. FEIT products are handmade using natural materials.

History
Tull Price grew up between Australia and Israel. He became interested in sneakers at an early age and founded Royal Elastics, as well as the footwear division of rag & bone.  His brother Josh Price was a DJ in Australia at the time and became involved in Royal Elastics by hosting parties in both NYC and Sydney.

The brand opened their first store in Sydney in 2006. They opened their second store in the Nolita area of NYC in November 2014. Their second New York City store opened September 2015 in the West Village.

The brand is now based in NYC.

Store Design
FEIT's first New York City location is across the street from The New Museum and was designed by installation artist Jordana Maisie Goot. The 500-square foot store is built largely from matte-polyurethaned birch plywood, and has been featured in the design magazine Frame.

FEIT's second NYC location in the city's West Village opened in September 2015. The store was also built by installation artist Jordana Maisie Goot. According to an article published by The New York Times, the 420-square-foot space features "Large slabs of raw wood float inches apart, from floor to ceiling — with nooks carved out to display the products" and features "an intricate lighting system with white LED lights that allows the store to brighten and dim depending on the time of day and season". Dezeen Architecture and Design Magazine, in an interview with Jordana describes the construction process as "similar to the process of shaping leather, the design team used moulds to carve out display shelves from blocks of timber during the 3D-modelling stage. The shelving components, made of Baltic birch plywood, were cut using a computer numerically controlled (CNC) machine. They were formed into modules and then delivered to the store."

Sustainable Construction
All FEIT shoes are handmade using biodegradable materials in factories with a low environmental impact that are free of harmful chemicals and synthetic materials. They are hand stitched without the use of machines to help reduce the amount of waste produced by the factory. "The sole is made up of five individual pieces. An internal leather midsole, a layer of natural cork, a buffalo leather outsole, a rubber tread and a vegetable leather strip which encases the sole to the upper." The shoe also includes a natural bamboo shank, buffalo leather insoles, natural leather welt, and cotton cording to sew it all together. FEIT shoes are primarily made using two different shoe-making techniques: Hand Sewn Goodyear and Hand Sewn Stitchdown construction.

Biotrainer
First released in 2014, the "Bio-Trainer" is the world's first all-natural, biological handmade sneaker. Produced from vegetable-dyed suede and leather, the sneaker features a 100% natural latex rubber sole made from the milk of the Hevea brasiliensis tree.

References

Shoe companies of the United States
Shoe brands
Clothing companies established in 2005
Shoe companies of Australia